Brian S. Evans is an American politician serving as a member of the Arkansas House of Representatives from the 43rd district.
Evans was elected in 2018 to represent the 43rd district. In his first term (92nd Arkansas General Assembly), Evans served on the following committees:
Academic Facilities Oversight Committee
Joint Performance Review Committee
Aging, Children and Youth, Legislative and Military Affairs Committee
House Education Committee
In his second term (93rd Arkansas General Assembly), Evans served on the following committees:
House Education Committee, Vice-chairman
House Insurance and Commerce Committee
Public Retirement and Social Security Programs Committee

Evans also serves on the Cabot Public School District School board.

Education and business career
Evans attended the University of Central Arkansas and Arkansas State University. Following graduation, Evans began to work as part of the logistics division of L & L Freight Services, Inc; eventually becoming a member of the board of the Transportation Intermediaries Association.

Personal life
Evans lives in Cabot, Arkansas, alongside his wife and two children.

References

Living people
Members of the Arkansas House of Representatives
University of Central Arkansas alumni
Arkansas State University alumni
People from Cabot, Arkansas
Year of birth missing (living people)